Lakhon Me Ek is a 1971 Indian comedy-drama film directed by S.S. Balan. The film stars Mehmood and Radha Saluja. This film is about brotherhood relationship between characters played by Pran and Mehmood. It is a remake of the Tamil film Ethir Neechal.

Synopsis
"Lakhon Mein Ek" is a story that suited Mehmood’s persona. He is cast as Bhola, who fights for survival literally by doing various errands in a Bombay chawl, on his feet the whole day yet struggling to make ends meet. “Bhola Aa Gaya” as he pleads at the door of various chawl residents in anticipation of some food for his work but sometimes disdain and insults are what comes his way.

Pran is cast as Sher Singh, who has a soft spot for Bhola, who also finds support from Nasir Hussain, a veteran actor of more than three decades. Lalita Pawar is the typical demanding senior citizen and here she plays the mother of Gauri (Radha Saluja), who comes to the chawl and finds solace in the company of Bhola.

Bhola is the central part of the story. He must attend to various chores and find time to study. His education is sponsored by a kind-hearted professor (David) but life is tough for Bhola. He seeks care and affection which comes his way from Gauri, who is smitten by the simple living of Bhola. “Chanda O Chanda”, one of R.D. Burman’s finest compositions, is sung by Lata and Kishore in solos, but sadly wasted in the contrived circumstances created in “Lakhon Mein Ek”.

Never mind if the story fails to engage the audience. What strikes most is the huge assembly of character actors that producer and director S.S. Balan packs in this movie. From David, Kanhaiyyalal, Madan Puri, Ramesh Deo, Shobha Khote, Aruna Irani to Jalal Agha, Mukri, Mohan Choti in cameos there is an impressive array. Mukri’s is a superb character immersed in his own world, the newspaper an inseparable part of his life. Nothing is acceptable to him unless it finds mention in the newspaper.
A dream sequence duet – “Jogi O Jogi Arre Pyaar Mein Kya Hoga” – did figure in the popularity charts but there were a couple of forgettable numbers too, a raunchy Padma Khanna dance finding an avoidable presence in the story.

But watch what happens when a man (Madan Puri) who is also a millionaire arrives from Singapore and tells the chawl residents that Bhola is his son and he has come to give him his name and wealth.

Cast
Mehmood as Bhola
Radha Saluja as Gauri
Pran as Sher Singh 
Aruna Irani as Renu
Madan Puri as Jaggu
Nazir Hussain as Dindayal
Mukri as Makhanlal
Kanhaiyalal as Manoharlal
Lalita Pawar as Leela
Ramesh Deo as Keshavlal
Shubha Khote as Jayshree
Keshto Mukherjee as Mr. Chatterjee
Sulochana Chatterjee as Sumitra Chatterjee
Jalal Agha as Jeevan
David as Professor

Soundtrack

References

External links
 

1971 films
1970s Hindi-language films
1971 comedy-drama films
Films scored by R. D. Burman
Hindi remakes of Tamil films
Films with screenplays by K. Balachander
Indian films based on plays
Films about orphans
1971 comedy films
1971 drama films